Giraffa sivalensis is an extinct species of giraffe occurring in Asia during the Pliocene and Pleistocene epochs. Almost perfectly preserved cervical vertebrae have been found, as well as humeri, radii, metacarpals and teeth. The size of G. sivalensis was proposed to be approximately 400 kg, and the neck length was about 147 to 390 cm according to proposals in 2015.

References
On reconstructing Giraffa sivalensis, an extinct giraffid from the Siwalik Hills, India, PeerJ.com (2015)

Pliocene mammals of Asia
Pleistocene mammals of Asia
Prehistoric giraffes
Pliocene even-toed ungulates
Pleistocene even-toed ungulates
Fossil taxa described in 1843